John Burwell Reed (February 2, 1933 – November 10, 2022) was an American professional baseball player, an outfielder over all or parts of three seasons (1961–1963) with the New York Yankees. Reed was a member of the 1961 and 1962 World Series champion Yankees, although he did not appear in the latter series. An alumnus of the University of Mississippi, Reed's primary role for the Yanks was as a late-inning defensive replacement for injury-riddled star outfielder Mickey Mantle. For this reason, he was popularly known as Mantle's "caddie."

He spent his entire professional career in the Yankee organization as a player (1953–1955; 1958–1964) and minor league manager (1965–1967). During his Major League career, Reed hit .233 with one home run and six runs batted in in 222 games played (and 129 at-bats). He was only one of seven players in Major League Baseball history with more career games played than plate appearances. He appeared in three games of the 1961 World Series against the Cincinnati Reds (won by the Yankees in five games) as a defensive replacement, spelling Mantle, Héctor López and Johnny Blanchard; he did not have a plate appearance.

On June 24, 1962, Reed hit the only home run of his career in the top of the 22nd inning, as the Yankees beat the Detroit Tigers 9–7 in the longest game in Yankees' history. The blow came off Phil Regan at Tiger Stadium. Reed's 30 MLB hits also included two doubles and one triple.

Reed died November 10, 2022.

References

External links

 Reed bio at SABR

1933 births
2022 deaths
Baseball players from Mississippi
Binghamton Triplets managers
Binghamton Triplets players
Fort Lauderdale Yankees managers
Kansas City Blues (baseball) players
Major League Baseball outfielders
New Orleans Pelicans (baseball) players
New York Yankees players
Ole Miss Rebels baseball players
People from Humphreys County, Mississippi
Quincy Gems players
Richmond Virginians (minor league) players